Psah Chas (literally "Old Market"), also commonly spelt as  Phsar Chas, Psar Chas or Psar Chaa, is a market in the city of Siem Reap in northern Cambodia. Not to be confused with the similarly named Psah Chas in Phnom Penh that is geared toward locals, this market in the south of the city caters to locals and tourists alike. The market is such a fixture in Siem Reap that many businesses give their address in relation to Psah Chas. The Khmer word "psah" ("market")) is derived from "pasar" ("market"), either from Malay or Cham, both of which in turn derive from Persian "bazar".

The market is popular with tourists in the city and sells souvenirs, including T-shirts, silverware, silk, wood and stone carvings, Buddhas, and other items. It is also known for its variety of Cambodian cuisine, and has a number of food stalls which sell a variety of rices, dried fish and pork sausages, vegetables and fruits, and a Cambodian specialty Prahok, a type of fermented fish paste. Some stalls sell baguettes and spiced frogs, which is believed to be a relic of French colonialism in the area. Other stalls cook up various Khmer soups and red chili slices and peanuts.

See also
Central Market, Phnom Penh,
List of markets in Phnom Penh

References

Cambodian cuisine
Siem Reap
Tourist attractions in Siem Reap province
Retail markets